Patty Guggenheim is an American comedian, writer and actress. A member of The Groundlings comedy troupe, as an actress she is best known for her role as Madisynn King on She-Hulk: Attorney at Law.

Career
As a comedian Guggenheim was part of  The Groundlings comedy troupe main company. She appeared on Curb Your Enthusiasm in 2021. She had minor roles as an actress on Reno 911!, Mr. Mayor, Superstore, The Middle, Modern Family, and Splitting Up Together. She had a regular roles on Pop TV’s comedy series Florida Girls and MTV’s Mary+Jane. Guggenheim also wrote for and acted in Barely Famous and additionally, voiced Patty Mime on SuperMansion.

Guggenheim appeared in 2022 in She-Hulk: Attorney at Law on Disney+, portraying Madisynn King, a party girl and unwitting magician’s assistant who forms an unlikely friendship with Wong, portrayed by Benedict Wong. The character became a fan favourite and calls have been made for Guggenheim and Wong to have their own spin-off show, or a spin-off show for Guggenheim with Jameela Jamil who plays Titania on the series. Florida Girls and She-Hulk: Attorney at Law director Kat Coiro commented that Guggenheim and Wong’s riffing on subjects such as The Sopranos and cocktails was improvised and un-scripted, with Coiro quoted as saying "That came purely from the actors' comedic chemistry and us going, 'We've got to throw some cameras on these two because they're so funny." Coiro also commented on how frequently she has worked with Guggenheim, and why, saying "I do not go anywhere without that woman. She is a comedic genius.. she came in and auditioned for us, and everybody [watching that audition] was actually crying with laughter. Tears streaming down their faces." Guggenheim's performance was praised for having ‘a quiet brilliance’ and ‘Guggenheim’s Madisynn was one of the first truly contemporary characters to enter the MCU in a while — someone who for better or worse felt real’ by TVLine who awarded Guggenheim  TVLine Performer of the Week.

Personal life
Guggenheim told the media she lives in the old apartment of fellow MCU actor Chris Hemsworth in Los Angeles and still occasionally receives his mail at the address. She is a graduate of Indiana University.

References

1984 births
Living people
Indiana University alumni
American women comedians
21st-century American actresses
American television actresses